Edha is a 2018 Argentine Spanish-language web television series starring Brian Beacock, Heinz K. Krattiger and Tomás Sala. The plot revolves around the ambitious, successful fashion designer and single mother Edha (Juana Viale) who meets the handsome and mysterious man Teo (Andrés Velencoso), a Central American immigrant seeking revenge, in the heart of a Buenos Aires fashion house. Soon she finds herself embroiled in a dark tale of crime and deception, and have to fight to keep both her professional and private life from falling apart.

It was ordered direct-to-series, and the first full season premiered on Netflix streaming on March 16, 2018.

Cast
 Juana Viale as Edha
 Andrés Velencoso as Teo
 Brian Beacock as Antonio
 Heinz K. Krattiger as Inversor Suizo
 Sofía Castiglione as Celia Vargas, Teo's girlfriend

Release
The full first season of Edha consisting of 10 episodes premiered on Netflix streaming on March 16, 2018.

References

External links
 
 
 

Spanish-language Netflix original programming